is a Japanese politician of the Liberal Democratic Party who served as the Minister of Agriculture, Forestry and Fisheries and as a member of the House of Representatives the Hokkaido 2nd district in the Diet. A native of Tokyo who grew up in Yoichi, Hokkaido and a graduate of Nihon University, he was elected to the first of his three terms in the assembly of Hokkaido in 1979 and then to the House of Representatives for the first time in 1996.

He represented the Hokkaido 2nd district.

On October 2, 2018, Yoshikawa took office as the Minister of Agriculture, Forestry and Fisheries to September 11, 2019.

In late 2020, Yoshikawa was accused of accepting multiple bribes totalling million from Hiroshima-based Akita Foods between October 2018 and September 2019, during his time as agriculture minister. On 21December 2020, Yoshikawa announced his resignation from the Diet, citing health reasons and saying he "will not be able to carry out activities that will fulfill the mandate of the people". Opposition Constitutional Democratic Party of Japan secretary general Tetsuro Fukuyama said he "feel[s] it is wrong to resign without a single explanation concerning the allegations".

References

External links
 Official website in Japanese.

Living people
1950 births
Liberal Democratic Party (Japan) politicians
Members of the House of Representatives (Japan)
Nihon University alumni
21st-century Japanese politicians
Politicians from Tokyo
People from Yoichi, Hokkaido